Enteropsidae is a family of copepods belonging to the order Cyclopoida.

Genera:
 Enterocola van Beneden, 1860
 Enterocolides Chatton & Harant, 1922
 Enteropsis Aurivillius, 1885
 Lequerrea Chatton & Harant, 1924
 Mychophilus Hesse, 1865
 Mycophilus Hesse, 1865

References

Copepods